or Japanese mustard spinach (Brassica rapa var. perviridis) is a leaf vegetable. It is a variety of Brassica rapa, the plant species that yields the turnip, mizuna, napa cabbage, and rapini. It is grown commercially in Japan and Taiwan. It is a versatile vegetable that is cooked and eaten in many ways. The plant is also used for fodder in some Asian countries.

It was named by Tokugawa Yoshimune, the eighth shogun, who visited Edogawa in 1719 for hunting and stopped at the local Katori Shrine for lunch. The shrine priest served him soup with a rice cake and a local leaf vegetable. The shogun was impressed by the flavor of the vegetable so much and named it komatsuna, after the nearby Komatsu River (which gives Komatsugawa its name). Till this day, the Shin-Koiwa Katori Shrine offers komatsuna to the deities on New Year's Eve. People who come to the shrine to pray on New Year's Day are also given komatsuna for good luck in the new year.

Since the days of the shogun, komatsuna has been bred to have a sweeter taste. The old variety thought to have been served to the shogun is not widely available. That variety is called Goseki bansei. It grows faster and has bigger but fewer leaves than ordinary komatsuna, and a strong, spicy flavor.

The leaves of komatsuna may be eaten at any stage of their growth. In a mature plant they are dark green with slender light green stalks, around 30 centimeters (12") long and 18 cm (7") wide. It is most often grown in the spring and autumn, as it cannot endure extreme heat or cold for more than a short time. Although nowadays it's grown year-round in green houses.

Cooking
Komatsuna has a fresh, sweet taste and a crunchy texture. It is a very versatile vegetable and can be eaten raw, pickled, stir-fried, boiled, used fresh in salads, or added to soups. It is popular in soups as it can stay firm after being simmered. It is an excellent source of calcium, vitamin A, and vitamin C.

See also
Brassica juncea

References

Leaf vegetables
Japanese vegetables
Brassica